Staberoha is a group of plants in the Restionaceae described as a genus in 1841. The entire genus is endemic to Cape Province in South Africa.

 Species

 Formerly included
moved to other genera: Restio Thamnochortus 
 Staberoha caricina - Thamnochortus erectus
 Staberoha disticha - Restio distichus  
 Staberoha gracilis - Thamnochortus gracilis

References

Restionaceae
Endemic flora of South Africa
Flora of the Cape Provinces
Fynbos
Poales genera